Decimator may refer to:

 The collector or recipient of tithes
 Heinrich Decimator (c.1544 – 1615), a German Protestant theologian, astronomer and linguist
 Decimator (Farscape), a fictional race in the TV series Farscape
 Decimator (G.I. Joe), a fictional character in the G.I. Joe: A Real American Hero series
 Decimator (signal processing), a component that reduces a digital signal's sampling-rate
 Decimator (Star Wars), a fictional weapon in the game Star Wars: Galactic Battlegrounds
 Decimator, a fictional character from VR Troopers
 Decimator, a fictional character in The Jimmy Timmy Power Hour
 Decimator, a song by Canadian extreme metal band Strapping Young Lad from their 2006 album The New Black

See also
 Decimation (disambiguation)